Parents for Rock and Rap, founded in 1987 by Mary Morello in the United States, was an anti-censorship campaign which focuses on campaigning for the importance of free speech in popular music. For the work that Mary Morello put into this, she won a Hugh M. Hefner First Amendment Award in 1996. The campaign mainly focused on opposition to the Parents Music Resource Center.

Mary Morello is also the mother of guitar player Tom Morello, of Rage Against the Machine, Audioslave, The Nightwatchman and Street Sweeper Social Club.

External links
 Article about the group and its mission

Censorship in the United States
Censorship of music
1987 establishments in the United States